Alan John Williams (born 21 April 1954) is a British sprint canoer who competed from the late 1970s to the mid-1980s. He won two medals at the ICF Canoe Sprint World Championships with a gold (K-2 10000 m: 1983) and a bronze (K-4 10000 m: 1981). Williams was also a part of the army, based in Maidstone.

Williams also competed in two Summer Olympics, but did not advance to the final in either of the games he competed. His best finish was a fifth in the semifinal round of the K-4 1000 m event at Montreal in 1976.

References

 
 

1954 births
Canoeists at the 1976 Summer Olympics
Canoeists at the 1980 Summer Olympics
Living people
Olympic canoeists of Great Britain
ICF Canoe Sprint World Championships medalists in kayak
British male canoeists